MSTC may refer to:
MSTC Limited
Maharashtra State Textile Corporation
Manchester Suburban Tramways Company, a company established in 1877 to provide horse-drawn tram services throughout Manchester and Salford, England
Mansfield State Teachers College, a former name of Mansfield University of Pennsylvania
Math, Science, and Technology Center of Paul Laurence Dunbar High School, Lexington, Kentucky
Math Science Teaching Corps, U.S. legislation to recruit, train, and retain outstanding math and science teachers
MacNaughton Science & Technology Center, a former name of Bernice MacNaughton High School in Moncton, New Brunswick, Canada
Mid-State Technical College, central Wisconsin, United States